Nikolai Badriyevich Giorgobiani (born 16 July 1997) is a Russian football player. He plays as an attacking midfielder for FC Alania Vladikavkaz.

Club career
He made his debut in the Russian Professional Football League for FC Sochi on 29 July 2016 in a game against FC Krasnodar-2.

On 28 June 2019, he signed a long-term contract with the Russian Premier League club FC Ufa.

He made his debut in the Russian Premier League for FC Ufa on 13 July 2019 in a game against FC Ural Yekaterinburg, as a 79th-minute substitute for Azer Aliyev.

On 17 October 2020, he was loaned to FC Alania Vladikavkaz for the rest of the season. On 9 June 2021, Alania exercised a purchase option in the loan contract and Giorgobiani signed a 3-year contract with the club.

Honours

Individual
 Russian Professional Football League Zone South best young player (2018–19).

References

External links
 
 Profile by Russian Professional Football League

1997 births
Sportspeople from Sochi
Russian people of Georgian descent
Living people
Russian footballers
Association football midfielders
FC Armavir players
FC Chayka Peschanokopskoye players
FC Ufa players
Russian Premier League players
Russian First League players
Russian Second League players